Edea may refer to:
Edea (musical group), a Finnish musical group
Edea (album), an album by that group
Edéa, a city in the Littoral Province of Cameroon
Edea Kramer, a character in the video game Final Fantasy VIII